The 2020 Stetson Hatters football team represented Stetson University during the 2020–21 NCAA Division I FCS football season. They were led by eighth-year head coach Roger Hughes and played their home games at Spec Martin Stadium. They competed as members of the Pioneer Football League.

Previous season
The Hatters finished the 2019 season 7–4, 4–4 in PFL play to finish in a two-way tie for fifth place.

Schedule
Stetson released their full football schedule on February 25, 2020. The Hatters had games scheduled against  (September 5),  (September 12), and Presbyterian (October 3), which were later canceled before the start of the 2020 season.

References

Stetson
Stetson Hatters football seasons
Stetson Hatters football
College football winless seasons